Tihar may refer to:

 Tihar (festival), Nepalese festival
 Tihar Village, village in Delhi
 Tihar Jail, jail in Delhi